Procambarus plumimanus is a species of crayfish in the family Cambaridae. It is endemic to North Carolina. It is known from several locations, where it is often abundant. It is known commonly as the Croatan crayfish.

This crayfish is cylindrical in shape. It is light brown in color with dark mottling and washes of pastel greens and pinks.

This species lives on the coastal plain of North Carolina in a number of river systems. It lives in swampy habitat types, often in small, artificial, and temporary bodies of water. It will burrow into the substrate during dry periods.

It is listed as a least-concern species by the International Union for Conservation of Nature (IUCN). It has a limited geographical range but there is more than enough habitat available to support its populations, and its range has recently expanded.

References

Cambaridae
Endemic fauna of North Carolina
Freshwater crustaceans of North America
Crustaceans described in 1958
Taxonomy articles created by Polbot
Taxa named by Horton H. Hobbs Jr.